The Lady Says No is a 1951 American comedy film directed by Frank Ross, starring Joan Caulfield and David Niven, photographed by James Wong Howe, and featuring sequences filmed at Fort Ord, Pebble Beach and Carmel, California. The supporting cast features Frances Bavier, who later played "Aunt Bee" on television's The Andy Griffith Show. Director Ross was married to Caulfield, the film's leading lady.

Plot 
Bill Shelby (David Niven) is a globe-trotting author and photographer on assignment from Life magazine to do a photo story on Dorinda Hatch (Joan Caulfield), best-selling author of the title book, "The Lady Says 'No'". Rather than finding a dour spinster, as he expects, she is a young blonde woman he finds attractive. Her interactions with him lead her to question her feminist convictions, such as it being unsuitable for a woman to illogically fall in love with someone she also loathes. The unbidden thoughts and impulses even invade her subconscious in a dream sequence.

It is a battle of the sexes, and the id and ego, as the two clash. Bill tries to show her that her book is "all rot"; Dorinda tries to prove her theories that love is just an autonomic function and not really worth it. They find that they all have a lot to learn, and forgive. It looks like sometimes the answer is "no", and sometimes "yes".

Mayhem follows, when her errant uncle returns, and they get pulled into the lives of the colorful local characters. A barroom brawl ensues when Bill rebuffs Dorinda's attempts at seducing him and she proceeds to charm all the single men there. One of those men is a married man named Potsie. Goldie, his wife, confronts Dorinda in the powder room. Talking her way out of the fight, Dorinda asks Goldie if she would be better off without Potsie, and she says yes because she thinks he's a jerk.

There is a timeskip and Dorinda learns that Goldie has left Potsie, who's gone to live with Bill in Bill's trailer. Dorinda collects Goldie, who has practically memorized Dorinda's book, and goes to find the men. When they won't come out of the trailer, Dorinda steals Bill's car and drags the trailer into the military base, leading to a high speed police pursuit. Still, Potsie won't come out. A misunderstanding leads to the General being notified of a flying saucer report and coming to the trailer scene. He orders Potsie to exit and talk to his wife, with whom he reconciles after Dorinda tells Goldie that her book is stupid and that she's sorry that she ever wrote it because Potsie and Goldie love each other and belong together in spite of the fighting.

Dorinda packs her bags and moves out of her aunt's home while her aunt and uncle reconcile. She's off in her car to find Bill and confess her feelings. Bill explains away the folly of her feminist views and her book as an obsession with sexual repression that appeals to the sexually repressed. Dorinda throws Goldie's copy of her book into the ocean and resolves to write a book entitled 27 Ways to Say Yes.

Cast 
Joan Caulfield as Dorinda Hatch
David Niven as Bill Shelby
James Robertson Justice as Matthew Hatch
Lenore Lonergan as Goldie
Frances Bavier as Aunt Alice Hatch
Peggy Maley as Midge
Henry Jones as Potsy
Jeff York as Goose
George Davis as Warf Rat Bartender
Robert Williams as General Schofield
Mary Lawrence as Mary

Reception
The New York Times critic agreed with David Niven's "trenchant observation [in the film], 'This went out with silent pictures!' Yes, indeed."

See also
 Down with Love (2003 film)

References

External links 

1951 films
1951 comedy films
American black-and-white films
American comedy films
Films scored by Emil Newman
United Artists films
Films scored by Arthur Lange
1950s English-language films
1950s American films